Marion Buisson (born 19 February 1988 in Mende, Lozère) is a French pole vaulter. She set her personal best height of 4.50 metres by upsetting her teammate Vanessa Boslak, and by winning the women's pole vault at the 2008 French Athletics Championships in Albi.

Buisson represented France at the 2008 Summer Olympics in Beijing, where she successfully cleared a height of 4.15 metres in the women's pole vault, an event which was later dominated by world-record holder Yelena Isinbayeva of Russia. Buisson, however, failed to advance into the final, as she placed twenty-third overall in the qualifying rounds, tying her position with Iceland's Thórey Edda Elisdóttir.

References

External links

Profile – French Olympic Committee 
NBC 2008 Olympics profile

1988 births
Living people
French female pole vaulters
Olympic athletes of France
Athletes (track and field) at the 2008 Summer Olympics
People from Mende, Lozère
Mediterranean Games bronze medalists for France
Athletes (track and field) at the 2013 Mediterranean Games
Mediterranean Games medalists in athletics
Sportspeople from Lozère
20th-century French women
21st-century French women